The Silver Okum Building (also known as Hotel Lotus, the Market Apartments, Market Hotel, and the Silver Oakum Building), is a building in Seattle's Pike Place Market, in the U.S. state of Washington. Located at the intersection of Pike Place, Pine Street, and Post Alley, the structure was built during 1909–1910. It was joined internally with the adjacent Triangle Building in 1977. Fred Bassetti completed in the remodel.

Businesses which have operated in the building include Cinnamon Works and The Confectional.

References

External links

 

1910 establishments in Washington (state)
Buildings and structures completed in 1910
Central Waterfront, Seattle
Pike Place Market